Gidi Pass is a strategically important pass in the Sinai.

Mountain passes of Egypt